Black Mass: Apocalyptic Religion and the Death of Utopia is a non-fiction book by John N. Gray published in 2007. Gray was at the time the School Professor of European Thought at the London School of Economics and in the book he further develops his critique of social progress. In recent history, he looks at the New Right government of Margaret Thatcher and the neoconservative government of George W. Bush. He also connects totalitarianism, that is communism and Nazism, with millenarianist movements in the Middle Ages, citing examples such as that of John of Leiden, who led a rebellion in the German city of Münster in 1534. In here he is helped by the work of Norman Cohn, The Pursuit of the Millennium. His main thesis is that the influence of said religious movements created the secular, Enlightenment belief in social progress. This philosophy of history, known as teleology, has contaminated the contemporary isms, including classical liberalism.

The book is split into six chapters, each of which is around 40 pages and is in turn split into sub-chapters:
 The Death of Utopia
 Enlightenment and Terror in the Twentieth Century
 Utopia Enters the Mainstream
 The Americanization of the Apocalypse
 Armed Missionaries
 Post-Apocalypse

External links
 Through the looking glass, a review of Black Mass in New Humanist by A. C. Grayling
 Black Mass, briefly noted in The New Yorker

2007 non-fiction books
Books about ideologies
Criticism of neoconservatism
Philosophy of religion literature